The 2008 Copa Libertadores Finals was a two-legged football match-up to determine the 2008 Copa Libertadores champion. The series was contested between Liga Deportiva Universitaria de Quito from Quito, Ecuador, and Fluminense Football Club from Rio de Janeiro, Brazil, both of whom were playing in their first finals. The first leg was played at LDU Quito's home field,  La Casa Blanca in Quito, Ecuador on 25 June 2008; the second leg was played at Fluminense's home field, Maracanã in Rio de Janeiro, Brazil on 2 July 2008. LDU Quito won the final on penalties 3–1, after each team won a game apiece, and equalized on goal difference after the end of extra-time of the second leg. With this achievement, LDU Quito became the first Ecuadorian club to win a Copa Libertadores title.

Qualified teams

Finals rules
Like other match-ups in the knockout round, the teams will play two games, one at each team's home stadium. As the highest seeded team determined at the beginning of the knockout stage, Fluminense had home-field advantage for the second leg. Unlike other Copa Libertadores match-ups in the knockout round, the away goals rule is not used. If the teams remained tied after 90 minutes of play during the 2nd leg, extra time will be used, followed by a penalty shootout if necessary.

Route to the finals

Group 8 of the Second Stage

Fluminense and LDU Quito both started in the Second Stage and were drawn into Group 8 along with Arsenal of Argentina and Libertad of Paraguay. Their first match was against each other in La Casa Blanca in Quito. The game ended in a goal-less draw.

LDU Quito then hosted Libertad on March 4. Patricio Urrutia and Joffre Guerrón scored for LDU Quito to give them a 2–0 win. They then visited Arsenal in Buenos Aires on March 12. Patricio Urrutia scored the loan goal of the game. The roles were reversed as LDU Quito hosted Arsenal on March 26. Liga walloped Arsenal 6–1 with goals by Patricio Urrutia, Damián Manso, Luis Bolaños (2), Claudio Bieler, and Alfonso Obregón; Luciano Leguizamón scored for Arsenal. On April 8, Liga travelled to Asuncion to play Libertad, where they lost 3–1. Alfonso Obregón scored the lone goal for Liga.

After the first game against Liga, Fluminense hosted Arsenal on March 5. The drubbing ended 6–0 in favor of Flu. Thiago Neves, Dodô (2), Gabriel, Washington, and Cícero provided the scores. Flu then travelled to Asuncion to face Libertad on March 19. Washington scored twice to give Flu a 2–1 win. Flu then played host for Libertad in a game that ended in a 2–0 win for Fluminense. Cícero and Thiago Silva provided the scores. Fluminense then travelled to Buenos Aires to play Arsenal on April 8. They were beat 2–0.

The last match of group play for LDU Quito and Fluminense was against each other on April 17. Cícero scored the only goal of the game to give Fluminense a 1–0 win. The win gave Fluminense the group. Fluminense and LDU Quito finished 1 & 2 with 13 and 10 points, respectively, and each advanced to the Round of 16 as the 1st and 11th seed.

Fluminense in the knockout stage
Fluminense was seeded 1 for the knockout stage, guaranteeing home field advantage for the second leg of any series. In the round of 16, they faced Atlético Nacional of Colombia, whom they defeated on aggregate 3-1 (2-1 & 1-0). In the quarter-finals, they faced fellow Brazilian side São Paulo. They won on aggregate 3-2 (0-1 & 3-1). In the semi-finals, they face defending Copa Libertadores champions Boca Juniors. After tying 2-2 on the first leg, they won 3-1 in the second leg to advance to their first Copa Libertadores finals.

LDU Quito in the knockout stage
LDU Quito was seeded 12 for the knockout stage. In the Round of 16, they faced Estudiantes, whom they beat on aggregate 3-2 (2-0 & 1-2) to advance. They faced another Argentine team, San Lorenzo in the quarter-finals. After tying 1-1 in both legs, the teams went into penalties, where LDU Quito triumphed 5-3. In the semi-finals, they faced Club América of Mexico. They tied both legs 1-1 in Mexico City and 0-0 in Quito. Since LDU Quito scored an away goal, they won the series and advanced to their first Copa Libertadores finals.

Finals summary

First leg
The First Leg was played in front of a capacity crowd at Estadio Casa Blanca in Quito. Claudio Bieler of LDU Quito scored first in the 2nd minute, but Fluminense answered back with a goal by Darío Conca in the 12th minute. LDU Quito scored three unanswered goals by the end of the half with goals by Joffre Guerrón (29'), Jairo Campos (34'), and Patricio Urrutia (45'). Thiago Neves scored again for Fluminense with the only goal of the second half at the 52nd minute. The final score left LDU Quito with a 2-goal advantage going into the next leg.

Second leg
The Second Leg was played in front of a capacity crowd at the legendary Maracanã in a game that would crown the South American champions. Luis Bolaños of LDU Quito scored first in the 6th minute to put LDU Quito up 1–0 in the game, and a three-goal advantage. Fluminense answered back with a hat-trick by Thiago Neves who scored goals in the 12th, 28th, and 56th minute. The score at the end of regulation was 3–1, leaving both teams equal on goal difference; extra-time was needed. After a scoreless extra-time, the game went on to a penalty shootout. LDU Quito goalkeeper José Francisco Cevallos blocked three of four penalty kicks, while his teammates put in three of four to give LDU Quito the win, and their first Copa Libertadores title.

Aftermath
Prior to the matches, Fluminense was favored to win since they had eliminated the defending champion (Boca Juniors) in the semifinals, and defeated LDU Quito in an earlier encounter at Maracanã. Following the surprise loss in Quito, pressure was on Fluminense to win at home. When LDU Quito sealed the deal at Maracanã, the media dubbed the match a "Maracanazo", a slang term in Latin American football given to a game at Maracanã where the underdog team upsets the hosts. As the hosts were expected to win, that the celebratory confetti for the award presentation was in Fluminense's color.

LDU Quito had won their first Copa Libertadores title, becoming the first Ecuadorian team to do so. The title is also the first international title ever won by a team from Ecuador. LDU Quito captain Patricio Urrutia was named player of the finals, and Joffre Guerrón was named player of the tournament. By winning the tournament, LDU Quito won the right to represent South American in the 2008 FIFA Club World Cup, for which they qualify directly to the semi-finals. LDU Quito winning the Copa Libertadores was called historic by major newspapers that followed the competition, and won praise throughout the continent.

Throughout the tournament, the team and its player gained wide support from across Ecuador, not just by their typical fan-base in Quito. Following the win, they were publicly applauded by every sector of Ecuadorian society and government, and were treated as heroes upon their return to the country.

Currently, this year's finals hold or shares two Copa Libertadores Finals records: most goals in a single game (6) for Game 1; most goals in two legs (10).

References

Final
Copa Libertadores Finals
Copa Libertadores Final 2008
Copa Libertadores Final 2008
Copa Libertadores Finals 2008